Bradley Richard Montague Scriven (born 8 December 1993) is an English former first-class cricketer.

Scriven was born at High Wycombe in December 1993. He was educated at Cranleigh School, he went up to Cardiff Metropolitan University. While studying at Cardiff, he made five appearances in first-class cricket for Cardiff MCCU from 2014–16. Scriven scored 172 runs in his five matches, at an average of 34.40 and a high score of 67 not out, which he made against Glamorgan in 2016.

References

External links

1993 births
Living people
People from High Wycombe
People educated at Cranleigh School
Alumni of Cardiff Metropolitan University
English cricketers
Cardiff MCCU cricketers